The 1984 United States presidential election in Nevada took place on November 6, 1984. All 50 states and the District of Columbia, were part of the 1984 United States presidential election. State voters chose four electors to the Electoral College, which selected the president and vice president of the United States.

Nevada was won by incumbent United States president Ronald Reagan of California, who was running against former vice president Walter Mondale of Minnesota. Reagan ran for a second time with incumbent vice president and former C.I.A. director George H. W. Bush of Texas, and Mondale ran with Representative Geraldine Ferraro of New York, the first major female candidate for the vice presidency.

The presidential election of 1984 was a rather partisan election for Nevada, with about 2% of the state voting for third parties, or for Nevada's "None of These Candidates" option. Every county gave Reagan a comfortable majority.

Nevada weighed in for this election as 16% more Republican than the national average. Reagan won Nevada by a resounding landslide margin of 34%. His vote share of 65.9% made it his tenth-best state nationally, and was the highest vote share any nominee of either party had won in the Silver State since 1936. The Mountain West as a whole had begun trending Republican in 1952, but Nevada remained more competitive than other states in the region through the 1960s and 1970s, being one of two states in the region (along with New Mexico) to vote for Kennedy in 1960, giving Nixon a plurality in 1968, and voting for Ford by just 4.4% in 1976. 

A dramatic shift came with Reagan's candidacy, however, as, in 1980, Nevada gave Reagan nearly as high a vote share as it had given Nixon in his 1972 landslide. Reagan improved his vote share still further in 1984. He carried every county in the state, including the largest county, Clark County (home to Las Vegas), which had typically voted Democratic from its founding in 1909 through 1976. Not only did he carry Clark, but he got a higher vote share in it than he did nationally, becoming the first nominee of either party to crack 60% in the county since 1964. He also won over two-thirds of the vote in the state's second population center, more typically Republican Washoe County (Reno). Only in rural and sparsely-settled White Pine County did Reagan fall below 60%, and even here he won by double digits. In eleven counties (including the state's third-largest county equivalent, Carson City), Reagan broke 70%.

Nevada would remain strongly Republican in 1988, but thereafter, it would return to being a more competitive state, as Clark County returned to the Democratic fold in 1992 (and has, as of 2020, never voted Republican again). Bill Clinton won it twice, but by narrow margins; but George W. Bush also won it only by narrow margins in his two elections. No nominee of either party has received as high a vote share in the state as Reagan, as of 2020.

Democratic platform

Walter Mondale accepted the Democratic nomination for presidency after pulling narrowly ahead of Senator Gary Hart of Colorado and Rev. Jesse Jackson of Illinois - his main contenders during what would be a very contentious Democratic primary. During the campaign, Mondale was vocal about reduction of government spending, and, in particular, was vocal against heightened military spending on the nuclear arms race against the Soviet Union, which was reaching its peak on both sides in the early 1980s.

Taking a (what was becoming the traditional liberal) stance on the social issues of the day, Mondale advocated for gun control, the right to choose regarding abortion, and strongly opposed the repeal of laws regarding institutionalized prayer in public schools. He also criticized Reagan for his economic marginalization of the poor, stating that Reagan's reelection campaign was "a happy talk campaign," not focused on the real issues at hand.

A very significant political move during this election: the Democratic Party nominated Representative Geraldine Ferraro to run with Mondale as Vice-President. Ferraro is the first female candidate to receive such a nomination in United States history. She said in an interview at the 1984 Democratic National Convention that this action "opened a door which will never be closed again," speaking to the role of women in politics.

Republican platform

By 1984, Reagan was very popular with voters across the nation as the President who saw them out of the economic stagflation of the early and middle 1970's, and into a period of (relative) economic stability.

The economic success seen under Reagan was politically accomplished (principally) in two ways. The first was initiation of deep tax cuts for the wealthy, and the second was a wide-spectrum of tax cuts for crude oil production and refinement, namely, with the 1980 Windfall profits tax cuts. These policies were augmented with a call for heightened military spending, the cutting of social welfare programs for the poor, and the increasing of taxes on those making less than $50,000 per year. Collectively called "Reaganomics", these economic policies were established through several pieces of legislation passed between 1980 and 1987.

Some of these new policies also arguably curbed several existing tax loopholes, preferences, and exceptions, but Reaganomics is typically remembered for its trickle down effect of taxing poor Americans more than rich ones. Reaganomics has (along with legislation passed under presidents George H. W. Bush and Bill Clinton) been criticized by many analysts as "setting the stage" for economic troubles in the United States after 2007, such as the Great Recession.

Virtually unopposed during the Republican primaries, Reagan ran on a campaign of furthering his economic policies. Reagan vowed to continue his "war on drugs," passing sweeping legislation after the 1984 election in support of mandatory minimum sentences for drug possession.  Furthermore, taking a (what was becoming the traditional conservative) stance on the social issues of the day, Reagan strongly opposed legislation regarding comprehension of gay marriage, abortion, and (to a lesser extent) environmentalism, regarding the final as simply being bad for business.

Results

Results by county

See also
 Presidency of Ronald Reagan
 United States presidential elections in Nevada

References

Nevada
1984
1984 Nevada elections